Fissurellidea bimaculata is a species of sea snail, a marine gastropod mollusk in the family Fissurellidae, the keyhole limpets and slit limpets.

References

External links
 To Barcode of Life (1 barcode)
 To Biodiversity Heritage Library (7 publications)

Fissurellidae
Gastropods described in 1871